The 2018 Western Michigan Broncos football team represented Western Michigan University (WMU) in the 2018 NCAA Division I FBS football season. They were led by second-year head coach Tim Lester and played their home games at Waldo Stadium as a member of the West Division of the Mid-American Conference. They finished the season 7–6, 5–3 in MAC play to finish in a three-way tie for second place in the West Division. They were invited to the Famous Idaho Potato Bowl where they lost to BYU.

Previous season
The Broncos finished the 2017 season 6–6, 4–4 to finish in fourth place in the West Division. Despite being bowl eligible, the Broncos did not receive an invite to a bowl game.

Preseason

Award watch lists
Listed in the order that they were released

Preseason media poll
The MAC released their preseason media poll on July 24, 2018, with the Broncos predicted to finish in third place in the West Division.

Schedule
The following table lists WMU's schedule.

Game summaries

Syracuse

at Michigan

Delaware State

at Georgia State

at Miami (OH)

Eastern Michigan

at Bowling Green

at Central Michigan

Toledo

Ohio

at Ball State

Northern Illinois

vs. BYU (Famous Idaho Potato Bowl)

References

Western Michigan
Western Michigan Broncos football seasons
Western Michigan Broncos football